Pål Espen Søbye (born 9 July 1954) is a Norwegian author and literary critic. He has a Mag.art. degree in philosophy, and was formerly employed at Statistics Norway in Oslo. He was named literary critic of the year in 2006 by the Norwegian Critics' Association.

Bibliography
1992: Ingen vei hjem. En biografi over Arthur Omre
1995: Rolf Stenersen. En biografi
1998: Stemmer fra Balkan (with Jo Nesbø)
2003: Kathe, alltid vært i Norge Kathe - Always Been in Norway (2019, eng. translation)
2010: En mann fra forgangne århundrer. Overlege Johan Scharffenbergs liv og virke 1869-1965. En arkivstudie
2014: Folkemengdens bevegelse 1735-2014. En tabellstudie.

References

1954 births
Living people
Norwegian statisticians
Norwegian biographers
Norwegian male writers
Male biographers
Norwegian literary critics